The 13th Reconnaissance Squadron is part of the 926th Wing at Beale Air Force Base, California. It operates RQ-4 Global Hawk unmanned aircraft conducting reconnaissance and surveillance missions.

Mission
The squadron provides theater commanders with near-real-time intelligence, surveillance, reconnaissance and target acquisition data.

History

World War II
The 13th flew combat in the European Theater of Operations from 28 March 1943 – 26 April 1945.

Airlift
In 1952, it converted to a troop carrier mission and provided intra-theater airlift for high-ranking USAFE military and civilian officials and small mission-essential equipment from, 1987–1993.  In 1987, it was renamed the 13th Military Airlift Squadron.

The squadron moved without personnel and equipment to McGuire Air Force Base, New Jersey, on 1 October 1993 and absorbed personnel and equipment of the 30th Airlift Squadron and was renamed the 13th Airlift Squadron. Equipped with C-141, the squadron took on a new worldwide airlift mission until its inactivation in 2000.

Unmanned reconnaissance
Since 2005 the 13th has operated and maintained deployable, long-endurance RQ-4 Global Hawk aircraft and ground control elements to fulfill training and operational requirements generated by the Joint Chiefs of Staff in support of unified commanders and the Secretary of Defense. It currently trains all RQ-4B pilots and sensor operators.

Lineage
 Constituted as the 13th Photographic Reconnaissance Squadron on 9 June 1943
 Activated on 20 June 1942
 Redesignated 13th Photographic Squadron (Light) on 6 February 1943
 Redesignated 13th Photographic Reconnaissance Squadron on 13 November 1943
 Inactivated on 1 December 1945
 Redesignated 13th Reconnaissance Squadron, Photographic on 11 March 1947
 Activated in the reserve on 6 July 1947
 Inactivated on 27 June 1949
 Redesignated 13th Troop Carrier Squadron, Medium on 26 May 1952
 Activated in the reserve on 14 June 1952
 Inactivated on 1 April 1953
 Redesignated 13th Military Airlift Squadron on 14 July 1987
 Activated on 1 October 1987
 Redesignated 13 Airlift Squadron on 1 April 1992
 Inactivated on 31 March 2000
 Redesignated 13th Reconnaissance Squadron on 10 February 2005
 Activated in the reserve on 12 March 2005

Assignments

 3d Photographic Group (later 3d Photographic Reconnaissance and Mapping Group), 20 June 1942 (attached to 1st Bombardment Wing from 2 December 1942, 8th Air Force from 16 February 1943)
 7th Photographic Reconnaissance and Mapping Group, 7 July 1943
 Unknown 21 November 1945 – 1 December 1945
 65th Reconnaissance Group, 6 July 1947 – 27 June 1949
 65th Troop Carrier Group, 14 June 1952 – 1 April 1953
 374th Tactical Airlift Wing, 1 October 1987
 316th Airlift Support Group, 1 April 1992
 18th Operations Group, 1 June 1992
 438th Operations Group, 1 October 1993
 305th Operations Group, 1 October 1994 – 31 March 2000
 610th Regional Support Group, 12 March 2005
 940th Operations Group, 1 July 2009
 726th Operations Group, 10 February 2016 – present

Stations

 Army Air Base Colorado Springs, Colorado, 20 June – 17 October 1942
 RAF Podington, England, 2 December 1942
 RAF Mount Farm, England, 16 February 1943
 RAF Chalgrove, England, 8 April 1945
 RAF Grove, England, c. 13 October – 23 November 1945
 Camp Kilmer, New Jersey, 30 November – 1 December 1945

 Rome Army Air Field, New York, 6 July 1947
 Chemung County Airport, New York, 26 January 1948 – 27 June 1949
 Mitchel Air Force Base, New York, 14 June 1952 – 1 April 1953
 Kadena Air Base, Japan, 1 October 1987
 McGuire Air Force Base, New Jersey, 1 October 1993 – 31 March 2000
 Beale Air Force Base, California, 12 March 2005 – present

Aircraft

 Lockheed P-38 Lightning (1942–1945)
 Piper L-4 Grasshopper (1942–1943)
 Supermarine Spitfire (1943)
 North American P-51 Mustang (1945)
 Curtiss C-46 Commando (1952–1953)
 Beechcraft C-12 Huron (1987–1993)
 Lockheed C-141 Starlifter (1993–2000)
 Northrop Grumman RQ-4 Global Hawk (2005–present)

References

Notes
 Explanatory notes

 Citations

Bibliography

External links
 13th Reconnaissance Squadron Fact Sheet 

Military units and formations in California
013
Military units and formations established in 1942
1942 establishments in the United States